Enrique Guerrikagoitia Meabe (born 3 June 1967) is a Spanish racing cyclist. He rode in the 1991 Tour de France.

References

External links
 

1967 births
Living people
Spanish male cyclists
Place of birth missing (living people)
People from Guernica
Sportspeople from Biscay
Cyclists from the Basque Country (autonomous community)